Jiqing Town is an urban town in and subdivision of Xinhua County, Hunan Province, People's Republic of China.

Administrative division
The town is divided into 54 villages and one community, the following areas: 

  Jinxing Community
  Da'anshan Village
  Jiqing Village
  Qixin Village
  Huchangshan Village
  Qishuping Village
  Nanpanshan Village
  Huoshiwan Village
  Xiaoyidang Village
  Xinlong Village
  Baiwanli Village
  Huashan Village
  Donghua Village
  Xinlian Village
  Ping'an Village
  Hengtian Village
  Shima Village
  Jianping Village
  Zhongshuitian Village
  Shiqiaowan Village
  Shangshuitian Village
  Zhangjialing Village
  Nanshan Village
  Jietouling Village
  Deming Village
  Dayuanxi Village
  Qingdang Village
  Jianming Village
  Yangqiao Village
  Guangming Village
  Pingtang Village
  Shengzuwan Village
  Changpai Village
  Zhaohui Village
  Longjing Village
  Laotangchong Village
  Damen'ao Village
  Furongfeng Village
  Chongshan Village
  Zimushan Village
  Lianfeng Village
  Xiaochong Village
  Mufang Village
  Youxiqiao Village
  Chenguang Village
  Dufudang Village
  Songjialing Village
  Tangjing Village
  Dashenshan Village
  Zhengfangchong Village
  Shanmuchong Village
  Fengmuxi Village
  Liuhua Village
  Xiaozhushan Village
  Jiangdixia Village

References

External links

Divisions of Xinhua County